Lissotrachelini is a tribe of anomalous crickets in the family Gryllidae. There are currently three genera described, with species records from the Americas and SE Asia.

Genera
These three genera belong to the tribe Lissotrachelini:
 Lissotrachelus Brunner von Wattenwyl, 1893
 Tohila Hubbell, 1938
 Trigonidomimus Caudell, 1912

References

Further reading

 
 

Crickets
Orthoptera tribes